The New Democratic Force (Nueva Fuerza Democrática) is a conservative political party in Colombia. 
At the last legislative elections, on 10 March 2002, the party won as one of the many small parties parliamentary representation.

References

Conservative parties in Colombia